Lindeman Island is an island in the Lindeman Group of the Whitsunday Islands  off the coast of Queensland, Australia. The island was named by Captain Bedwell after his sub-lieutenant, George Sidney Lindeman whilst aboard the Royal Navy vessel .

Most of the island is included in the Lindeman Islands National Park which also protects another 13 islands. There is also a resort and an airport on the island. Lindeman Island was created after a volcanic mountain range was drowned by rising sea levels.

History

The island was occupied by Aboriginal tribes, known generally as the Ngaro, until circa 1900, who used the area for fishing. It is unknown if they lived on the island permanently. An incident occurred on nearby Shaw Island between the local tribe and some Europeans in late August 1861.  One aboriginal was shot dead and Henry Irving, a squatter from Broadsound, and Nicholas Millar, a sailor from Rockhampton, were bludgeoned to death.  The Native Police officer at the logging camp of Eugene Fitzalan on Whitsunday Island was notified. A large punitive mission afterwards set out in two schooners under Lieut. Williams.  They destroyed the native camp and burnt or impounded all the canoes found. The aboriginals themselves apparently escaped into the mountainous terrain. They resisted later attempts to be relocated to the mainland. In 1905 Captain James Adderton took out a sheep grazing lease over the island and established facilities for shearing. In 1923 Angus Nicholson began a small lodge for visitors, although he did not build permanent accommodation until 1929. The Nicholsons had local Ngaro people working for them on the island. Goats roamed wild and visitors were requested to shoot only for food.

Before the end of WW2, Reg Ansett of Ansett Australia saw the potential of the area and began planning for air services. Starting in 1952 Barrier Reef Airways began flying boat services to a number of islands including Lindeman. Ansett opened Proserpine or Whitsunday Coast Airport in 1957 to allow transfers to smaller island aircraft. The resort was sold to P&O shipping in 1974, who then sold the resort to Club Med in 1992.

Resort
The resort was the first Club Med established in the Whitsunday Islands and in 1992 became the only Club Med village in Australia.

Lindeman Island resort was closed on 31 January 2012. On the 27 April 2012 it was purchased by White Horse Holding, a Chinese firm, for $12 million. The price paid was considerably lower than expected because the resort needed refurbishment.

White Horse are planning to redevelop the Island into three luxury resorts (5 star beach resort, 6 star spa resort, and 6 star eco resort) including upgrading the airstrip and facilities, a proposed 'safe harbour' where approximately 50 boats will be able to moor, two tourist villa precincts and a central village that will have a number of restaurants and cafes, sporting facilities, retail shops and communal recreation areas.

The Lindeman Island Project is currently going through what is known as the ‘Environmental impact statement process’ (EIS) If a ‘coordinated project’ has the potential to cause environmental, social or economic impacts, the project proponent must prepare an environmental impact statement.

White Horse are anticipating an approval late this year with construction to begin in 2017.

See also

 List of islands of Australia

References

External links

Lindeman Island. Queensland Holidays

Whitsunday Islands